Mauzy may refer to:

MacKenzie Mauzy, an American actress
Mauzy, Indiana
Mauzy, Virginia